Sawyer is an English surname originating in the occupation of sawyer, who is someone who saws wood. Notable people with the surname include:

People
Aaron W. Sawyer (1818–1882), Justice of the New Hampshire Supreme Court 
Ada Lewis Sawyer (1892–1985), American attorney
Alan Sawyer (1928–2012), American basketball player
Amos Sawyer (1945-2022), President of Liberia 1990–1994
Benair C. Sawyer (1822–1908), Mayor of Pittsburgh, Pennsylvania
Caleb Sawyer (1806-19881), American farmer and politician
Cami Sawyer, American and New Zealand mathematician
Caroline Mehitable Fisher Sawyer (1812–1894), American writer
Celia Sawyer, British art dealer appearing in Four Rooms
Charles L. Sawyer (1860-1918), American lawyer and politician
Charles Sawyer (sportsman) (1856-1921), British rugby and cricketer player
Chris Sawyer, Scottish computer game designer
Connie Sawyer (1912–2018), American actress
Diane Sawyer, American journalist and TV host
Fred Sawyer, American basketball player
Gary Sawyer, English football player
Gertrude Sawyer (1895–1996), American architect
Gordon E. Sawyer (1905–1980), American sound director
Grant Sawyer (1918–1996), Governor of Nevada
Harry William Sawyer (1880–1962), American physician and politician
Henry W. Sawyer (1918–1999), American lawyer and politician
Herbert Sawyer (Royal Navy officer, died 1798), British Royal Navy admiral
Herbert Sawyer (1783–1833), British Royal Navy admiral, son of the above
Hiram Sawyer (1814–1888), American farmer and politician in Wisconsin
Hiram Wilson Sawyer (1843–1922), American lawyer and politician in Wisconsin
Hugh E. Sawyer (born 1954/55), American businessman
Ivy Sawyer (1898–1999), American singer, actress and dancer
Jack Sawyer (born 2002), American football player
Joe Sawyer (1906–1982), Canadian actor
Josh Sawyer, American video game designer
Lee Sawyer, English footballer
Lewis E. Sawyer (1867–1923),  American congressman
Miranda Sawyer, English journalist
Natalie Sawyer, English sports presenter
Noah W. Sawyer (1877-1957), American educator, farmer, and politician
Peter Sawyer (historian) (1928–2018), English professor of medieval history
Philetus Sawyer (1816–1900), American politician
Ray Sawyer (1937–2018), singer from the band Dr. Hook
Regine Sawyer, American comics writer and editor
Reuben H. Sawyer (1866–1962), Oregon clergyman, advocate of British Israelism and Ku Klux Klan leader
Robert J. Sawyer, Canadian science fiction author
Roland D. Sawyer (1874–1969), Massachusetts clergyman and politician
Shawn Sawyer, Canadian figure skater
Stephen S. Sawyer, American painter
Sylvanus Sawyer (1822–1895), Massachusetts inventor and manufacturer
Thomas C. Sawyer, American politician
Tim Sawyer, British businessperson
Walter Warwick Sawyer (1911–2008), English mathematician
Webb D. Sawyer (1918–1995), American Marine general, Navy Cross recipient
William Sawyer (disambiguation), several people

Fictional characters
Annie Sawyer, one of the three main protagonists of the television series Being Human
Bubba "Leatherface" Sawyer, a fictional character in the horror movie The Texas Chain Saw Massacre
Buz Sawyer, title character of a long-running comic strip
Lila Sawyer, a character in Hey Arnold!
Peyton Sawyer, a fictional character on the hit television show One Tree Hill
Tom Sawyer, Mark Twain's famous literary character in multiple books
Veronica Sawyer, the protagonist of the 1988 film Heathers, and it's musical and TV adaptations
Will Sawyer, the protagonist in Skyscraper

English-language surnames
Surnames of English origin
Occupational surnames
English-language occupational surnames